Alexandre Freschi (born 17 May 1979) is a French politician of La République En Marche! (LREM) has been serving as a member of the French National Assembly since the 2017 elections, representing the department of Lot-et-Garonne.

Political career
In parliament, Freschi serves as member of the Committee on Cultural Affairs and Education and the Committee on European Affairs. In addition to his committee assignments, he is part of the parliamentary friendship groups with Italy and Portugal. In July 2019, Freschi voted in favor of the French ratification of the European Union’s Comprehensive Economic and Trade Agreement (CETA) with Canada.

See also
 2017 French legislative election

References

1979 births
Living people
Deputies of the 15th National Assembly of the French Fifth Republic
La République En Marche! politicians
People from Marmande
French people of Italian descent
Pantheon-Sorbonne University alumni